Pristigenys is a genus of marine ray-finned fish in the family Priacanthidae. It contains five extant species and one extinct species, P. substriata, which is known from fossils found in the Eocene of Monte Bolca, Italy.

The extant species have been classified in the genus Pseudopriacanthus which both Fishbase and the Catalog of Fishes treat as a synonym of Pristigenys,  but recent work has argued that they should be separated based on numerous differences in the cranial region and the fins.

Species
The following species are classified in the genus Pristigenys: 

 Pristigenys alta (Gill, 1862) - Short bigeye
 Pristigenys meyeri (Günther, 1872)
 Pristigenys niphonia (Cuvier, 1829) - Japanese bigeye 
 Pristigenys refulgens (Valenciennes, 1862)
 Pristigenys serrula (Gilbert, 1891) - Popeye catalufa
 Pristigenys substriatus (Blainville, 1818)

References

Further reading

 Nelson, J. S. (1994). Fishes of the World, Third Edition.. xvii + 600. John Wiley and Sons. New York.  . 
 

 
Priacanthidae
Extinct fish
Taxa named by Louis Agassiz
Taxa named by Henri Marie Ducrotay de Blainville